A referendum on congressional terms was held in the Federated States of Micronesia on 7 March 1995. The proposal to set a four-year term for all members of the Congress required the approval of three-quarters of the voters in at least three of the four states. However, it was only approved by a majority of voters (but not the 75% required) in Kosrae and Yap.

Results

By state

References

1995 referendums
1995 in the Federated States of Micronesia
Referendums in the Federated States of Micronesia